The 2012 Open BNP Paribas Banque de Bretagne was a professional tennis tournament played on hard courts. It was the eleventh edition of the tournament which was part of the 2012 ATP Challenger Tour. It took place in Quimper, France between 6 and 12 February 2012.

ATP entrants

Seeds

 1 Rankings are as of January 30, 2012.

Other entrants
The following players received wildcards into the singles main draw:
  Jonathan Dasnières de Veigy
  Romain Jouan
  Paul-Henri Mathieu
  Guillaume Rufin

The following players received entry as a special exempt into the singles main draw:
  Marius Copil

The following players received entry from the qualifying draw:
  Adrien Bossel
  Pierre-Hugues Herbert
  Olivier Patience
  Laurent Rochette

The following players received entry as a lucky loser into the singles main draw:
  Elie Rousset

Champions

Singles

 Igor Sijsling def.  Malek Jaziri, 6–3, 6–4

Doubles

 Pierre-Hugues Herbert /  Maxime Teixeira def.  Dustin Brown /  Jonathan Marray, 7–6(7–5), 6–4

External links
Official Website
ITF Search
ATP official site

Open BNP Paribas Banque de Bretagne
2012
2012 in French tennis